The Bauhaus Foundation in Tel Aviv, Israel, has a private museum on the ground floor of a building built in the International Style in 1934, located on 21 Bialik Street. It is owned by American billionaire, businessperson, art collector and philanthropist Ronald Lauder. Initial project was led by Daniella Luxembourg.

The display area of  contains furniture and belongings related to the Bauhaus movement of the 1920s and 1930s, as well as exhibitions about the International Style. Objects and furniture designed by Ludwig Mies van der Rohe, Marcel Breuer and Walter Gropius are included. The exhibits were loaned by private collections, mainly Lauder's own one.

Admission 
Admission is free. The museum is open twice a week, on Wednesdays from 11a.m. to 5p.m. and on Fridays from 10a.m. to 2p.m.

See also
Bauhaus Center Tel Aviv
Max-Liebling House (Tel Aviv)
White City, Tel Aviv

References

External links 
 

Museums in Tel Aviv
Bauhaus
Architecture museums
Museums established in 2007
White City (Tel Aviv)